William Kerwin (April 17, 1927 – October 27, 1989) was an American actor and filmmaker. He was most well known for his character roles in the films of Herschell Gordon Lewis.

Career 
Kerwin enjoyed some success on the stage and screen before being discovered by Herschell Gordon Lewis through the promotional short Carving Magic. His first feature film with Lewis was Living Venus, and he went on to star in some of the director’s best known works such as Blood Feast. In addition to playing principal roles, Kerwin served variously as the assistant director, makeup technician, gaffer, key grip and prop man for Lewis’ films. Kerwin was thus often involved in creating the gory practical effects that would become Lewis’ trademark.

Whether working with Lewis or other directors, Kerwin was closely associated with the exploitation film movement. In particular, he was known for work in nudist films and splatter films.

Throughout his career, Kerwin often performed under pseudonyms such as Thomas Wood in order to appear in non-union productions. He was registered with the Screen Actors Guild under the name Willam Kerwin.

Personal life 
Kerwin’s first marriage was to actress Hanna Hertelendy from 1953 to 1958. Kerwin had one daughter from his marriage to Hertelendy, costume designer Barbara Kerwin.

In 1964, Kerwin married Connie Mason, who he met while filming Blood Feast. The couple had two daughters, Denise and Kim, and remained married until Kerwin's death in 1989.

Kerwin was the brother of director Harry Kerwin and appeared in several of his films throughout the 1970s including God's Bloody Acre, Barracuda and Tomcats.

All three of Kerwin’s daughters pursued film careers for at least a decade. Half-sisters Barbara and Kim Kerwin had bit roles in Herschell Gordon Lewis’ The Gruesome Twosome as children; William Kerwin himself did not appear in this movie.  Both girls also collaborated with their uncle Harry Kerwin; Barbara had a small role in Sweet Bird of Aquarius while Kim acted in Cheering Section. Denise, William Kerwin’s youngest daughter, is the only of the three to never work with Lewis or Harry Kerwin during her acting career.

Filmography

Film

Television

References 

1927 births
1989 deaths
20th-century American male actors
American male film actors
American male television actors
American male stage actors